The Quarry Limekiln, near Erin, Tennessee, dating from around 1873, was listed on the National Register of Historic Places in 2004.

It is a "single masonry 'perpetual-burning' limekiln", built of limestone blocks on its exterior and with brick in its interior.

It was deemed significant for its association with the lime industry in the history of Houston County (where the lime industry was the most significant industry) and the Middle Tennessee region.

It is located on State Route 49, approximately 0.25 miles east of Denmark Rd.

References

Lime kilns in the United States
National Register of Historic Places in Houston County, Tennessee
Industrial buildings and structures on the National Register of Historic Places in Tennessee
Buildings and structures completed in 1873